Will Ashcroft (born 6 May 2004) is an Australian rules footballer playing for the Brisbane Lions Football Club in the Australian Football League (AFL). He was taken as pick number 2, under the father–son rule.

Ashcroft began playing football as a child at the age of six. The son of Marcus Ashcroft, a three-time AFL premiership player, Ashcroft's talent as a footballer was identified by the Gold Coast Suns Football Club at the age of ten. He played for various teams in Queensland as a child, before moving to Melbourne in 2019 at the age of 15 where he commenced playing for the a local football club, the Sandringham Dragons. During his time with the Sandringham Dragons, Ashcroft was promoted to captain and received the Larke Medal for best player at the national championships. 

At the 2022 AFL national draft, Ashcroft was chosen to play for the Brisbane Lions. Ashcroft is widely considered the best player in the 2022 draft class by AFL club recruiters.

Early life 
Ashcroft was born on 6 May 2004 on the Gold Coast, to parents Bekky and Marcus. He has a sister, Lucy and a brother, Levi.

Ashcroft attended All Saints Anglican School for most of his youth. His father Marcus Ashcroft, is a three-time AFL premiership player who competed in 318 games for the Brisbane Bears/Lions over the course of his 15-year professional career. Ashcroft played a variety of sports while growing up on the Gold Coast and was selected to represent Queensland in swimming as well as athletics before focusing on Australian rules football. He began playing junior football for Broadbeach at six years of age in the local Gold Coast under-8s competition and was identified as a standout by the Gold Coast Suns in 2014 at 10 years of age when he accepted an offer to take part in their development academy program as an under-age invitee.

Ashcroft has stated that his personal training standards were inspired by Gary Ablett Jr. and Touk Miller, with whom he spent time while training at the Gold Coast Suns and was personally given a team jumper from Miller in his younger years. At 11 years of age, he switched clubs and began playing for Southport in the under-14s Gold Coast AFL competition. Several years later he represented Queensland at 2018 U15 AFL National Championships, where his performances earned him All-Australian honours as a bottom ager. He was also awarded the Gold Coast Suns under-14s Academy Player of the Year award at the conclusion of the 2018 season. Ashcroft relocated to Melbourne in 2019 where he began attending Brighton Grammar and once again competed in the U15 AFL National Championships, although this time he would captain Victoria to an undefeated gold medal performance.

Ashcroft would temporarily move back to Queensland in 2020 to play in the QAFL junior league for Morningside during the COVID-19 pandemic affected year which cancelled all junior football competitions within Victoria. In 2021, after relocating to Victoria once again, Ashcroft was dubbed a top draft prospect after performing well for Victoria Metro in the U17 National Championships. Despite spending most of his childhood on the Gold Coast and five years in the Suns academy, the AFL ruled in April 2021 that Ashcroft was ineligible to be academy drafted by the Gold Coast Suns. 

In 2022, Ashcroft captained the Sandringham Dragons to a NAB League premiership and Victoria Metro to an U18 National Championship, later receiving the captaincy honour in the U18 All-Australian team as well as the Larke Medal. After finishing his Victorian Certificate of Education at Brighton Grammar towards the end of 2021, he began studying commerce and sports management at Deakin University. In August 2022, Ashcroft decided to return to his home state of Queensland and nominated for the 2022 AFL draft as a father-son selection for the Brisbane Lions.

AFL career 
After officially nominating as a father-son selection for the Brisbane Lions, Ashcroft was taken at Pick 2 in the 2022 AFL draft after the Lions matched North Melbourne’s bid. It was revealed that he agreed to a four-year deal with the Lions which will keep him at the club until at least the end of the 2026 season.

Ashcroft made his AFL debut in Round 1 against Port Adelaide, gathering 13 disposals and a goal in a 54-point defeat.

Personal life 
Ashcroft has said that playing for the same club as his father and returning to his home state of Queensland were the major driving forces behind his decision to sign with the Brisbane Lions, and that he hopes his brother Levi Ashcroft, who also plays for Sandringham, will join him at the Lions in the future. Levi Ashcroft is expected to be drafted into the AFL in 2024.

References 

Living people
2004 births
Sportspeople from the Gold Coast, Queensland
Australian rules footballers from Queensland
Sandringham Dragons players